Naṣr al-Thamalī was an Abbasid military commander and governor (wali or amir) of Tarsus and the borderlands with the Byzantine Empire in Cilicia.

Life

By 941, Nasr was himself governor of Tarsus. In winter of that year (December 941/January 942) he took advantage of a Byzantine expedition against Aleppo to raid Byzantine territory himself, returning with much plunder and prisoners, including senior Byzantine commanders. In October 946 he supervised the prisoner exchange with the Byzantines—headed by John the Mystikos and the magistros Kosmas — on the River Lamos on behalf of the Hamdanid emir Sayf al-Dawla, who had in the meantime become the new overlord of the Cilician marches. 2,482 Muslims were exchanged for an equal number of Byzantine captives; as the Byzantines held 230 prisoners more, they had to be ransomed with money.

References

Sources
 
 

10th-century deaths
Abbasid governors of Tarsus
Abbasid people of the Arab–Byzantine wars
People from the Hamdanid emirate of Aleppo
Abbasid ghilman
Sayf al-Dawla